Andrew Hamilton (18 December 1873– 20 March 1939) was a Scottish professional footballer who played as a winger for Sunderland.

References

1873 births
1939 deaths
Footballers from Falkirk
Scottish footballers
Association football wingers
Cambuslang F.C. players
Falkirk F.C. players
Sunderland A.F.C. players
New Brighton Tower F.C. players
Warmley F.C. players
Ryde Sports F.C. players
Watford F.C. players
English Football League players